Ravanasura is an upcoming Indian Telugu language psychological action thriller film directed by Sudheer Varma from a story written by Srikanth Vissa. It has an ensemble cast featuring Ravi Teja, Sushanth, Jayaram, Murali Sharma, Anu Emmanuel, Megha Akash, Daksha Nagarkar and Pujita Ponnada.
 
Besides acting, Ravi Teja produced the film under RT Team Works along with Abhishek Nama's Abhishek Pictures.

Cast

Production
The film which was announced on 5 November 2021 and got launched on 14 January 2022, The film's principal photography began in January 2022.  It is scheduled for a release on 7 April 2023.

Music
The music of the film is composed by Harshavardhan Rameswar and Bheems Ceciroleo. The first single titled "Pyaar Lona Paagal" was released on 18 February 2023.

References

 
2020s Telugu-language films
Films directed by Sudheer Varma
Films scored by Bheems Ceciroleo